II is the second album by Charade, the group that evolved from Bonfire.  It was released in 2004 by Drakkar Records and BMG International.  The album was recorded over a period of six years due to when Michael Bormann was available to record, Angel Schleifer was busy.  Then it was vice versa until finally the duo managed to find time to finish the product.  One track, Somebody's Waiting, was left over from the original recordings made in 1993.  This album has two versions in the market.  The original, sold in Japan, was a single CD of the album.  The special edition was sold worldwide and contained two CDs, the II album as well as the 1998 debut album.

Track listing

Band members
Michael Bormann - lead vocals, acoustic guitar
Angel Schleifer - lead guitars, keyboards, programming

2004 albums